Sardinella atricauda (Bleeker's blacktip sardinella) is a species of ray-finned fish in the genus Sardinella from the western Pacific.

Footnotes 
 

atricauda
Fish of the Pacific Ocean
Fish described in 1868
Taxa named by Albert Günther